Miria is a Los Angeles-based singer-songwriter. She is also one of the co-producers and directors of the Los Angeles Women's Music Festival.

Overview
Los Angeles based singer-songwriter Miria has released the album, Under the Surface and several singles. Her song Break Your Heart, from her album, won second place in the DBSA Facing Us 2008 Song Contest, Her song, Lullabye of Mars, won second place at the 2004 Mars Society Roget de Lisle song contest.

In 2007 Miria and Gayle Day, with Gilli Moon's Warrior Girl Music, co-produced the Los Angeles Women's Music Festival, the first festival of its kind in the Los Angeles area.

Trivia
In addition to being a singer-songwriter, Miria is also a UI/UX Designer and former employee of the Free Software Foundation. She also performed at the Car Talk anniversary show as a member of the Museum School Cheerleaders.

References

External links
Miria official website
Los Angeles Women's Music Festival official website

Year of birth missing (living people)
Living people
American women singer-songwriters
Musicians from Los Angeles
Singer-songwriters from California
21st-century American women singers
21st-century American singers